The 2012 Liberty Flames football team represented Liberty University in the 2012 NCAA Division I FCS football season. They were led by first-year head coach Turner Gill and played their home games at Williams Stadium. They were a member of the Big South Conference. They finished the season 6–5, 5–1 in Big South play to claim a share of the Big South Conference championship with Coastal Carolina and Stony Brook. Despite the conference title, the Flames were not invited to the FCS playoffs.

Schedule

Source: Schedule

References

Liberty
Liberty Flames football seasons
Big South Conference football champion seasons
Liberty Flames football